The 2011 ANZ Championship season was the fourth season of the ANZ Championship. The 2011 season began on 13 February and concluded on 22 May. With a team coached by Roselee Jencke, captained by Lauren Nourse and featuring Romelda Aiken, Laura Geitz, Clare McMeniman and Natalie Medhurst, Queensland Firebirds finished the season undefeated. They became the first team in the history of the ANZ Championship to go through the regular season and the playoffs without losing a single match. In the major semi-final, Firebirds defeated Waikato Bay of Plenty Magic  and in the grand final they defeated Northern Mystics, winning their first premiership. This marked the beginning of a golden age for Firebirds. Between 2011 and 2016, Jencke guided them to five grand finals and three premierships.

Transfers 

Notes

Head coaches and captains

Pre-season 
Tournaments

Notes
  Other participants in Queenstown included  and 

Matches
Northern Mystics, New South Wales Swifts and Waikato Bay of Plenty Magic played a series of five-quarter matches.

Regular season
In order to be concluded before the 2011 World Netball Championships, the regular season used a more condensed format. It still featured 65 games, but included several new features including three "double rounds" which featured seven or eight matches, rather than the traditional four or five. The "bye" rounds were dropped and Thursday night matches were introduced for five of the regular rounds.

Round 1

Round 2

Round 3

Round 4

Round 5

Round 6

Round 7: Rivalry Round
Round 7 featured five Australia verses New Zealand matches. Goals scored by Australian and New Zealand teams were added together and the country with the most goals won the Rivalry Round Trophy.  Australia won the 2011 Rivalry Round with an aggregate score of 263–239 over New Zealand.

Round 8

Round 9

Round 10

Round 11

Round 12 

Notes
  The Round 3 match between Canterbury Tactix and Northern Mystics was due to be played on 27 February. However it was postponed due to the 2011 Christchurch earthquake. The match was rescheduled for 7 April.
  The Round 4 match between Canterbury Tactix and Waikato Bay of Plenty Magic was originally scheduled to be played in Christchurch. However following the earthquake, the match was moved to Rotorua. It was still regarded as a "home" match for Tactix.

Final table

Playoffs
<onlyinclude>

Minor semifinal

Major semifinal

Preliminary final

Grand final

Season statistics

Award winners

ANZ Championship Most Valuable Player

Best Young Player

All Star Team

Australian Netball Awards

Gallery

References 

 
2011
2011 in New Zealand netball
2011 in Australian netball